Peljidiin Genden (1892 or 1895 – November 26, 1937) was a prominent political leader of the Mongolian People's Republic who served as the country's first President (1924 to 1927; Navaandorjiin Jadambaa was just the acting president) and the ninth Prime Minister (1932–1936). As one of three MPRP secretaries, Genden was responsible for the swift compulsory implementation of socialist economic policies in the early 1930s.  In 1932 he was granted Joseph Stalin's support to become Prime Minister, but then increasingly resisted pressure from Moscow to liquidate institutional Buddhism and permit increased Soviet influence in Mongolia.  His independent temperament, outspokenness (he became famous for fearlessly confronting Stalin during their public meetings in Moscow and was one of the few to stand up to Stalin's strong personality), and growing nationalist sentiments ultimately led to his Soviet-orchestrated purge in March 1936.  Accused of conspiring against the revolution and spying for the Japanese, he was executed in Moscow on November 26, 1937.

Early life and career

Peljidiin Genden was born in present-day Khujirt district of Övörkhangai Province in either 1892 or 1895 (sources differ). In 1922 he joined the Mongolian Revolutionary Youth League (MRYL) and a year later he was appointed acting head of his local cell.  He attended the first session of the Mongolian Great Khural in Ulaanbaatar in November 1924 as a delegate from Övörkhangai. There, Prime Minister Balingiin Tserendorj took notice of his outspokenness and based on his recommendation Genden was elected chairman of the Presidium of the State Small Khural or Baga Khural, the small assembly that controlled day-to-day matters of state. This made him the effective head of state of Mongolia, a position he would hold from November 29, 1924 to November 15, 1927, and served concurrently as the Chairman of the Central Bureau of Mongolia's Trade Unions.

Leftist Deviation

Genden served as one of three secretaries of the Mongolian People's Revolutionary Party's Central Committee from December 11, 1928 to June 30, 1932.  Together with fellow secretaries Ölziin Badrakh and Bat-Ochiryn Eldev-Ochir (and later Zolbingiin Shijee) Genden urged for swift compulsory implementation of socialist economic policies such as forced collectivization, bans on private enterprise, the closure of monasteries and the forfeiture of their property. The policy proved disastrous as traditional herders were forced off the steppe and into badly managed collective farms, destroying one third of Mongolian livestock. Over 800 properties belonging to Mongolian nobles and Buddhist monasteries were confiscated and the heads of over 700 noble households were executed. As a result, open revolt broke out in several provinces between 1930 and 1932.  In response, Moscow ordered the suspension of what it termed the "Leftist Deviation" policies of the Mongolian government and in May 1932 several party leaders (including Badrah, Shijee, and Prime Minister Tsengeltiin Jigjidjav) were purged for trying to implement socialist measures "prematurely".

Prime Minister

Genden deftly survived the purge by meeting with Joseph Stalin in 1932 and winning over the Soviet leader. Through Moscow's support, Genden was named (Chairman of the Assembly of People's Commissaries) on July 2, 1932, replacing the purged Jigjidjav.  Genden was placed in charge of the implementation of Mongolia's "New Turn" or "New Reform" economic plan. The nation's new economic model was considered an easing of more strict communist economic principles. The plan was  closely modeled on Vladimir Lenin's 1921 Soviet New Economic Policy. This new policy in Mongolia included a reduction in taxes as well as less restrictions on private businesses and religious institutions.  Genden's popularity increased as Mongolia's economy was strengthening and shortages were being reduced. For the first time since the revolution the government was in a more dominant position vis-à-vis the MPRP.

The Lkhümbe Affair

In 1933 a personal feud between two party functionaries led to trumped up accusations of widespread conspiring within the party with Japanese spies, especially among Buryats.  Several of those arrested and interrogated by Soviet agents in Ulaanbaatar fingered Jambyn Lkhümbe, then secretary of the MPRP Central Committee, as their leader. Genden, party leader Eldev-Ochir, and Security Directorate Chief D. Namsrai backed the subsequent investigation that saw several hundred innocent persons, including Lkhümbe, arrested.  56 were eventually executed (including pregnant women), 260 were jailed for three to ten years and 126 were sent to the USSR.  The vast majority of those persecuted were Buryats. Public opinion at the time held that Genden and D. Namsrai, head of the Internal Affairs Committee, had initiated the affair to purge political enemies, but there is evidence that the affair was driven in large part by Soviet agents looking to weaken the Buryat population in Mongolia.

Resisting Stalin

Ties between Stalin and Genden began to fray as early as 1934 when, at a meeting with Genden in Moscow, Stalin urged him to destroy Mongolia's Buddhist clergies. He told the Mongolian leader to exterminate more than 100,000 of his nation's lamas, which Stalin called "the enemies within". Genden, a staunch Buddhist, was once quoted as saying "On earth there are two great geniuses – Buddha and Lenin." In 1933 Genden stated his intention to "not to fight against religion" and allowed Mongolian lamas to practice their religion in public, directly challenging Stalin's orders.

Suspicious of growing Soviet domination in Mongolia, Genden actively postponed both a 1934 bilateral gentlemen's agreement in which the USSR promised to protect Mongolia from potential invasion  as well as the 1936 "Treaty of Friendship and Cooperation" that allowed for the stationing of Soviet troops in Mongolia. Genden hoped to stave off Soviet domination by exploiting the diplomatic strain between the USSR and Japan to Mongolia's benefit, but the policy would later prove to be his undoing as accusations surfaced in 1936 that he was working on the side of the  Japanese.   Genden likewise hesitated on Stalin's recommendations that he elevate Mongolia's internal affairs committee to a fully independent ministry and that he increase the size of Mongolia's military.

In December 1935, Genden was brought back to Moscow where Stalin again rebuked him for failing multiple times to act on his guidance. Later, a heavily intoxicated Genden publicly scolded Stalin at a reception for the Mongolian Embassy, shouting "You bloody Georgian, you have become a virtual Russian Czar". Genden then reportedly slapped Stalin, broke his pipe, and hinted that Mongolia was considering an alliance with the Empire of Japan.

Purged

Upon Genden's return to Mongolia, Khorloogiin Choibalsan, acting under orders from Stalin, organized the second plenary meeting of Mongolian People's Revolutionary Party in March 1936 in Ulaanbaatar to permanently remove Genden from office. Party members led by Dorjjavyn Luvsansharav reprimanded Genden for his actions in Moscow and accused him of sabotaging relations with the Soviet Union. He was subsequently removed from his offices of both the prime minister and the foreign minister and then placed under strict house arrest. Anandyn Amar was appointed as the prime minister for the second time in Genden's place. With the purge of Genden, Choibalsan became Stalin's favored official in Ulaanbaatar and was named head of the new Internal Affairs Ministry, effectively making him the most powerful person in Mongolia.

Death

Genden was "invited" to the USSR, ostensibly for medical care, in April 1936. He then spent one year at the resort town of Foros on the Black Sea. In summer 1937, he was arrested during Stalin's Great Purge and under interrogation admitted to plotting with "lamaist reactionaries" and "Japanese spies."  By order from the Military Collegium of the Supreme Court of the USSR, Genden was executed in Moscow on November 26, 1937  for "his attempt to political coup and being a spy of Japan."

Rehabilitation

Genden was declared a nonperson in Mongolia; however, he would be rehabilitated in 1956 by the Military Collegium of the Supreme Court of the Soviet Union, nearly two decades after his death. Genden's actions and history remained obscured in Mongolia until the country's democratic revolution in 1990.

His daughter Tserendulam opened the "Memorial Museum for Victims of Political Repression" in his house in 1993. It offers information on the victims of the political prosecutions, which according to some estimates affected up to 14% of the population.

References

1890s births
1937 deaths
Mongolian communists
Great Purge victims from Mongolia
Executed prime ministers
Executed presidents
Mongolian People's Party politicians
Prime Ministers of Mongolia
Soviet rehabilitations
Speakers of the State Great Khural
Heads of state of Mongolia
Mongolian expatriates in the Soviet Union
Communism in Mongolia
People from Övörkhangai Province
Mongolian people executed abroad
Executed communists